The men's 50 kilometre cross-country race at the 1956 Winter Olympics took place on 2 February. Thirty skiers from thirteen countries participated in the event. The Nordic countries once again dominated the event. In a reversal of the top two results in the  race, Swedish skier Sixten Jernberg won the gold, Fin Veikko Hakulinen took the silver and Russian Fedor Terentjev won the bronze. Jernberg would go on to win a bronze in the relay event giving him a full complement of gold, silver and bronze. Hakulinen would win a silver in the relay event giving him a gold and two silver medals for the Olympics.

Medalists

Source:

Results

* - Difference is in hours:minutes.seconds.

Source:

See also

 1956 Winter Olympics

Notes

References
 

Men's cross-country skiing at the 1956 Winter Olympics
Men's 50 kilometre cross-country skiing at the Winter Olympics